Yang Yang may refer to:

Arts and entertainment
 Yang Yang (painter) (born 1953), Chinese-born American artist and sculptor
 Yang Yang (conductor) (born 1973), Chinese conductor with Hangzhou Philharmonic Orchestra
 Yang Yang (tenor) (1974/75 – 2019), Chinese tenor
 Yang Yang (actor) (born 1991), Chinese actor
 Bian Jinyang (born 1993), Chinese author who writes under the pen name Yang Yang
 Yang Yang (director), Chinese director, see Golden Eagle Award for Best Television Series Director (China)
 Liu Yangyang (born 2000), member of China based band WayV

Sportspeople
 Yang Yang (badminton) (born 1963), Chinese badminton player 
 Yang Yang (baseball) (born 1986), Chinese baseball player
 Yang Yang (speed skater, born 1976), Chinese speed skater, Olympic gold medalist
 Yang Yang (speed skater, born 1977), Chinese speed skater, Olympic silver medalist
 Yang Yang (sprinter) (born 1991), Chinese sprinter
 Yang Yang (swimmer) (born 1997), Chinese Paralympic swimmer

Others
 Prince Yangyang (born Wang Seo), Goryeo-prince who became the ancestors of King Gongyang
 Yang Yang (scientist) (born 1958), Taiwanese-born materials scientist at University of California, Los Angeles
 "Yang Yang" (song), a 1972 song by Yoko Ono
 Yang-Yang Arrondissement, Senegal

Pandas
Yang Yang (Atlanta giant panda) (male, born 1997), his name means "little sea"
Yang Yang (Vienna giant panda) (female, born 2000), or "Sunshine", at the Vienna Zoo

See also 
Ying Yang Twins, an Atlanta-based American crunk rap duo
Yangyang County, South Korea
Yangyang International Airport, South Korea
Yangyang Monastery, Sikkim, India

Human name disambiguation pages